Abdul Manaf bin Hashim is a Malaysian politician. He is the Member of Perak State Legislative Assembly for Pengkalan Baharu from 2013 to 2022.

Controversies 
On 4 December 2020, he had proposed a motion of confidence in the Perak State Legislative Assembly towards the Menteri Besar of Perak, Ahmad Faizal Azumu from Perikatan Nasional. The speaker, Mohammad Zahir Abdul Khalid had agreed to the motion. As a result, Ahmad Faizal no longer have the majority in the Perak State Legislative Assembly from Barisan Nasional and Pakatan Harapan.

On 23 December 2020, the new Menteri Besar of Perak, Saarani Mohamad has appointed him as a Special Adviser for the Menteri Besar due to his capacity of being an experienced and serving people's representative. However, Saarani denied that the appointment is due to the overthrow of Ahmad Faizal.

Election results

Honours 
  :
  Knight Commander of the Order of the Perak State Crown (DPMP) – Dato' (2010)

External links

References 

Malaysian Muslims
United Malays National Organisation politicians
Living people
Year of birth missing (living people)